CFGP-FM (97.7 FM, 97.7 Rock) is a Canadian radio station in Grande Prairie, Alberta. Owned by Rogers Sports & Media, it broadcasts an active rock format.

CFGP began as an AM station in 1937 and over the years, the station switched to different AM frequencies (1200, 1310, 1340, 1350, 1050) until moving to its current frequency at 97.7 MHz after receiving approval by the CRTC in 1996.

CFGP was an affiliate of CBC Radio network and its predecessor, the Trans-Canada Network, until 1981.

Rebroadcasters
CFGP has the following rebroadcasters:

References

External links
 
 

CFGP 1973-1981 HISTORY

FGP
FGP
FGP
Radio stations established in 1937
1937 establishments in Alberta